Thoughts Become Things II is the second studio album by Markus Schulz under his alias Dakota and was released on 1 July 2011.

Track list
"Gypsy Room" (07:41)
"Red Star" (06:00)
"Sleepwalkers" (05:31)
"I'm Where It Went Wrong" (04:30)
"Sinners" (04:19)
"Terrace 5 a.m." (06:05)
"Katowice" (04:13)
"Tears" (04:28)
"Suggestion No. 5" (05:00)
"In a Green Valley" (04:31)
"Miami" (06:39)
"Cape Town" (04:36)
"Saints" (06:15)
"Apollo" (08:44)

References

2011 albums